Stathmopoda campylocha is a species of moth in the family Stathmopodidae. It is endemic to New Zealand. It is classified as critically endangered by the Department of Conservation.

Taxonomy 
This species was first described by Edward Meyrick in 1889 using specimens collected in Wellington and Dunedin in January. The type specimen is held at the Natural History Museum, London and the type locality is recorded as being "Dunedin, New Zealand".

Description 
Meyrick described the species as follows:

Distribution 
This species is endemic to New Zealand. Historically this species occurred at Wellington and Dunedin, and in 1915 Charles E. Clarke collected a specimen in mid December at Silverstream, Upper Hutt. A further specimen was collected in early February in 1932 in the Pohangina Forest Reserve and was used by George Vernon Hudson to create an illustration of the species. In more recent times S. campylocha has been found to be present in western and eastern Otago including in the Matukituki Valley.

Ecology and habitat 
Meyrick collected his specimens amongst forest and Hudson concurred that the species frequents forest habitat.

Host species

In 2000 Brian H. Patrick discovered that S. campylocha is associated with the nationally endangered plant Olearia hectorii. Patrick was unable to locate S. campylocho larvae feeding but he hypothesised that they are likely detritivores or alternatively that they feed on scale insects. He also suggested other possible host plants might be Olearia fimbriata, Olearia lineata, Olearia bullata or Olearia fragrantissima. Plant-SyNZ indicates Olearia virgata as another possible host plant, attributed to Patrick (2000).

Conservation Status 
In 1939 Hudson stated that S. campylocha was regarded as being extremely rare. This species has been given the "Nationally Critical" conservation status under the New Zealand Threat Classification System.

References

External links
Hudson's 1939 illustration of S. campylocha. Plate LX, Fig. 5.

Moths described in 1889
Stathmopodidae
Taxa named by Edward Meyrick
Moths of New Zealand
Endemic fauna of New Zealand
Endangered biota of New Zealand
Endemic moths of New Zealand